The by-election for Lyttelton in 1873 was a by-election held in the  electorate during the 5th Parliament of New Zealand, on 19 May 1873.

It was held because John Thomas Peacock was appointed to the New Zealand Legislative Council. Peacock's brother-in-law, Henry Richard Webb, won the election.

Results

References

By-elections in New Zealand
1873 elections in New Zealand
Politics of Christchurch
1870s in Christchurch
History of Christchurch
Lyttelton, New Zealand